Padamsen Chaudhary is an Indian politician.  He was elected to the Lok Sabha, the lower house of the Parliament of India  as a member of the  Bharatiya Janata Party.

References

External links
Official biographical sketch in Lok Sabha website

1955 births
living people
Lok Sabha members from Uttar Pradesh
India MPs 1996–1997
India MPs 1999–2004
Bharatiya Janata Party politicians from Uttar Pradesh